Metioche  is a genus of sword-tail crickets in the tribe Trigonidiini.  Species have been found in tropical South America, Africa, Asia and Australia.

Species

Subgenus Metioche Stål, 1877
Metioche apicalis (Chopard, 1930)
Metioche baroalbae Otte & Alexander, 1983
Metioche bicolor (Stål, 1861)
Metioche bimaculata Chopard, 1952
Metioche bolivari Chopard, 1968
Metioche boliviana (Chopard, 1956)
Metioche chamadara (Sugimoto, 2001)
Metioche comorana Chopard, 1956
Metioche fascithorax Chopard, 1929
Metioche flavipes (Brunner von Wattenwyl, 1878)
Metioche fusca (Chopard, 1917)
Metioche fuscicornis (Stål, 1861)
Metioche fusconatata Chopard, 1934
Metioche gigas (Bolívar, 1900)
Metioche haanii (Saussure, 1878)
Metioche japonica (Ichikawa, 2001)
Metioche kotoshoensis (Shiraki, 1930)
Metioche kuthyi Chopard, 1927
Metioche lateralis Chopard, 1927
Metioche lesnei Chopard, 1935
Metioche luteola (Butler, 1876)
Metioche machadoi Chopard, 1962
Metioche maorica (Walker, 1869)
Metioche massaica (Sjöstedt, 1910)
Metioche minuscula Chopard, 1962
Metioche monteithi Otte & Alexander, 1983
Metioche nigra Chopard, 1927
Metioche nigripes Chopard, 1926
Metioche ocularis (Saussure, 1899)
Metioche ornatipes Chopard, 1927
Metioche pallidicornis (Stål, 1861)
Metioche pallidinervis Chopard, 1928
Metioche pallipes (Stål, 1861)
Metioche perpusilla (Bolívar, 1912)
Metioche peruviana Chopard, 1956
Metioche quadrimaculata Chopard, 1952
Metioche schoutedeni Chopard, 1934
Metioche sexmaculata Chopard, 1952
Metioche substriata Chopard, 1962
Metioche tacita (Saussure, 1878)
Metioche vittaticollis (Stål, 1861) - type species - (M. v. vittaticollis from Manila, Philippines).

subgenus Superstes Hugel, 2012
Metioche payendeei Hugel, 2012
Metioche superba Hugel, 2012

References 

Crickets
Ensifera genera
Trigonidiinae